Mikkel Mejlstrup Pedersen (born 7 January 1996) is a Danish professional footballer who plays as a midfielder for Danish Superliga club Randers FC.

Career

Randers
Pedersen started playing football for local club Hobro IK at age four, progressing through various youth levels before moving to the Randers FC academy at under-15 level.

Hobro
On 20 July 2016, he returned to Hobro without having made a senior appearance for Randers. Pedersen made his professional debut on 31 July 2016, replacing Anders Holvad in the 59th minute of a 1–1 home draw against FC Helsingør in the Danish 1st Division. The club reached promotion in his first season, as Pedersen made 20 total appearances.

He made his debut at the top level, the Danish Superliga, on the first matchday of the 2017–18 season, a 2–1 win over Helsingør in which he came off the bench for Danny Olsen in the 81st minute.

Pedersen scored his first goal on 16 September 2018, equalizing in the Superliga match against Vendsyssel FF, which ended in a 1–1 away draw.

Return to Randers
On 3 August 2022, Pedersen returned for his second stint at Randers FC, signing a three-year contract.

References

1996 births
Living people
Danish men's footballers
Danish Superliga players
Danish 1st Division players
Randers FC players
Hobro IK players
Association football midfielders
People from Hobro
Sportspeople from the North Jutland Region